Diez Canseco is the last name/surname of several Peruvian politicians.

Ana Elena Townsend Diez Canseco, Congresswoman from 2001 to 2006
Francisco Diez Canseco, President of Peru in 1872
Javier Diez Canseco, Peruvian Congressman and presidential candidate in the 2006 elections
Manuel Yrigoyen Diez Canseco, Mayor of Lima from 1919 to 1920
Pedro Diez Canseco, President of Peru in 1863, 1865, and 1868
Raúl Diez Canseco, Vice President of Peru from 2001 to 2004

See also
Alfredo Pareja Diezcanseco